SkyCity Entertainment Group, also known as simply SkyCity, is a gambling and entertainment company based in Auckland, New Zealand. It owns and operates five casino properties in New Zealand and Australia, which include a variety of restaurants and bars, three luxury hotels, convention centre, and Auckland's Sky Tower.

The group was established in 1996 as the owner of the SkyCity Auckland complex. In 1998 it took over operations of the complex from Harrah's Entertainment.

The company's shares are traded on both the Australian and New Zealand stock exchanges.

History

Since opening its original Auckland casino on 2 February 1996, SkyCity has expanded its operations to several New Zealand and Australian cities.

In June 2000, it bought the Adelaide Casino. It added another casino to its portfolio when it opened SkyCity Queenstown in the alpine resort of Queenstown.

In 2001, SkyCity bought a half share in cinema operator Force Corporation for $19.4 million, and rebranded it as SkyCity Leisure. 

In June 2004, the group acquired a 41% stake in the Christchurch Casino when it bought Aspinal Limited. Although the deal was opposed by Skyline Enterprises, the other owner of 41% stake, it was approved by the Casino Control Authority and the Commerce Commission. However, in 2012 SkyCity sold its shares to Skyline for $80 million and bought Skyline's 40% stake in Queenstown Casino for $5 million.

In July 2004, SkyCity bought the Darwin Casino and Hotel from MGM Mirage and rebranded it as SkyCity Darwin.

In February 2010, the group sold its cinema operating business to Australian firm Amalgamated Holdings Limited (now Event Hospitality and Entertainment).

Evan Davies was the founding Chief Executive, before leaving the group in 2008. During Davies' 11 years, the company grew from a single site to having business operations throughout New Zealand, South Australia and the Northern Territory. In April 2016, longtime CEO Nigel Morrison stepped down as Managing Director and Chief Executive. Graeme Stephens was appointed as SkyCity's Chief Executive from May 2017 to December 2020, with Chief Operating Officer Michael Ahearne stepping in as the new CEO from January 2021 until present. 

In October 2017, the group acquired NPT Limited's interest in AA Centre in Auckland for NZ$47 million.

In November 2018, SkyCity sold the Darwin Casino to American company Delaware North for $188 million.

In June 2019, SkyCity obtained governmental permission to buy a 1.01-hectare parcel of land in Queenstown to develop a new luxury hotel.

In August 2019, SkyCity launched its online gambling website, SkyCity Online Casino. The website is operated by Malta-based Gaming Innovation Group (GiG) on behalf of SkyCity's Maltese subsidiary.

SkyCity casinos often depend to a large degree on several hundred high-stakes gamblers, often from East Asia, who may gamble hundreds of thousands of dollars in one visit to a casino. Reported net profit after tax (NPAT) was $128.7 million, with the Group seeing revenue exceeding $1 billion for the first time in the company's history .

As a result of the COVID-19 pandemic, SkyCity announced 200 job losses in New Zealand on 3 April 2020, and a further 700 redundancies a month later, on 11 May. In 2020, SkyCity planned to raise new equity of $230 million to strengthen its balance sheet as part of its pandemic recovery plan.

Properties 
The SkyCity group owns five casinos in Australia and New Zealand: SkyCity Auckland, SkyCity Hamilton, SkyCity Queenstown, SkyCity Wharf Casino, and SkyCity Adelaide.

SkyCity Adelaide 

Adelaide Casino was bought by SkyCity Entertainment Group in June 2000. Back then it had 767 gambling machines and 72 table games. Currently it has 990 gambling machines and 90 gambling tables. It has the only table gambling license issued out by the South Australian Government, giving it a monopoly over the gambling business in the state. In 2011 SkyCity financed a $339 million expansion project to make the casino closer towards the city's riverfront.

SkyCity Auckland 

SkyCity Auckland is New Zealand's largest casino. Located in Central Auckland, it provides table and slot machine gambling, with 1647 gambling machines and 110 gambling tables. The facility includes the  Sky Tower, two hotels, convention centre, a 700-seat theatre, and more than 20 restaurants and bars with regular live bands, DJs and other entertainment. It opened on 2 February 1996.

SkyCity Hotel, Auckland is a four-star casino hotel. It is one of New Zealand's busiest hotels and is located inside the main Auckland complex. It serves mainly families, business people and casino customers. It offers 323 rooms, which were refurbished in 2013.

SkyCity Grand Hotel is a luxury five-star hotel and was officially opened by Prime Minister Helen Clark in April 2005. It is not located inside the main complex but is adjacent and is connected by a sky bridge. It serves VIPs, business people and high stake gamblers who play at the casino. The Grand features 21 floors and 316 rooms. The rooms comprise The Grand Suite, 8 Self Contained Suites, 11 King Suites and 296 rooms. Facilities and services include 24-hour room service and reception, a swimming pool, fitness center with personal trainers, sauna, health spa, baby sitting and a hotel doctor.

In 2013, through a deal with the Government, SkyCity pledged to build a new convention centre catering for up to 3500 guests and costing $402 million, in exchange, it will get more gambling concessions. However, the construction was delayed due to cost increase, and on 22 October 2019 the building caught fire while still under construction.

SkyCity Hamilton 
SkyCity Hamilton is a casino in Hamilton, New Zealand, that opened in September 2002. The casino is authorized to offer a maximum of 339 gambling machines and 23 tables. It has a restaurant and a bar, with live music and other performers on Friday and Saturday nights. It is part of the Riverside Centre on the Waikato River, which includes bars, restaurants and ten-pin bowling all operated by SkyCity Hamilton.

SkyCity Queenstown and SkyCity Wharf Casino 

Queenstown is New Zealand's only region that hosts two casinos, both are owned and operated by SkyCity. The two casinos are SkyCity Queenstown, opened in December 2000, with 86 gambling machines and 12 gambling tables, and the nearby SkyCity Wharf Casino, situated in the Steamer Wharf complex, with 74 gambling machines and 6 gambling tables. In 2018, the two relatively small casinos contributed only 1% of the company's nearly $1 billion turnover.

Former properties

SkyCity Darwin 
SkyCity Darwin, previously known as the MGM Grand Darwin, was the only casino in Darwin, the capital of the Northern Territory, Australia. SkyCity bought the casino, including a 5 star hotel, from MGM Mirage on 23 June 2004 for US$140 million. SkyCity Darwin housed 700 gambling machines and 40 gambling tables.

SkyCity sold the Darwin property to American company Delaware North in November 2018 for $188 million and it was subsequently renamed as Mindil Beach Casino & Resort.

Digital operations

SkyCity Online Casino 
On 21 May 2019, SkyCity announced a long-term agreement with Malta-based Gaming Innovation Group (GiG) to supply technology for SkyCity's new real-money online casino. SkyCity Online Casino, which operates using GiG's Malta Gaming Authority online gambling license, was launched in August 2019.

In December 2021, SkyCity invested NZ$42 million in GiG, making it its largest single shareholder with a stake of about 11 percent.

LetsPlay.Live 
SkyCity entered the esports market in October 2017 when it formed a joint venture with Let's Play Live Media (LPLM). SkyCity acquired a 40% stake in LPLM and built an esports broadcasting studio in the Sky Tower which opened in February 2018. Since July 2019, SkyCity has had full ownership of LPLM.

Controversy

Alongside other eligible New Zealand businesses, SkyCity Entertainment Group received significant financial support in the form of wage subsidies from the New Zealand government as part of a widespread economic stimulus programme following the COVID-19 outbreak. After initially receiving NZ $21.6 million in taxpayer-funded assistance, the company received an additional tranche of $9.4 million from the central government in July 2020. In all, SkyCity Entertainment Group received over $30 million from New Zealand taxpayers in 2020. Despite then subsequently posting a profit of over NZ $66.3 million, SkyCity steadfastly refused to repay the funds in spite of its bumper profits, a move which was widely condemned across the New Zealand political spectrum and identified as an example of the "waste" and "fraud" treasury had earlier warned of. 

On first week of June, 2021, Australian financial watchdog AUSTRAC intimated SkyCity Entertainment Group along with Crown Resorts and Star Entertainment Group about "potentially serious breaches" of anti-money laundering regulations at their casinos in Adelaide, Perth and Sydney respectively.

See also
Gambling in New Zealand
Crown Resorts
Star Entertainment Group

References

Gambling companies of New Zealand
Companies based in Auckland
Gambling companies established in 1996
Companies listed on the Australian Securities Exchange
Companies listed on the New Zealand Exchange
New Zealand companies established in 1996
Entertainment companies established in 1996
Online casinos